Mendori is a village in the Bhopal district of Madhya Pradesh, India. It is located in the Huzur tehsil and the Phanda block. The National Law Institute University, The Sanskaar Valley School and the Kerwa Dam reservoir are located nearby.

Demographics 

According to the 2011 census of India, Mendori had 243 households. The effective literacy rate (i.e. the literacy rate of population excluding children aged 6 and below) was 59.93%.

References 

Villages in Huzur tehsil